Aubrey Gene Coleman (born October 9, 1987) is an American professional basketball player for Spartak Primorye of the Russian Super League. He played college basketball as an all-Conference USA player for the University of Houston where he became the NCAA's leading scorer for the 2010 season.

Career

Early years
Coleman attended high school at Thurgood Marshall High School, though never played on the team. After graduating, he attended Gulf Shores Academy, and then junior college at Southwest Mississippi Community College.

College
Coleman played as a guard for Houston under the jersey number 12, and majored in sociology.  At Houston, Coleman was the 2009 Conference USA Newcomer of the Year as well as a selection for the 2009 All-Conference USA first team.  He also received honors of being named to the 2008–09 NABC All-District 11 first team and the 2008–09 USBWA All-District VII Team.  His junior season where he started 32 for games, he was the team leader for the Cougars with 19.4 points per game, and was second-place for rebounds per game with 8.2.  He also led the league with 2.3 steals per game, received the Conference USA Rookie of the Week award five times, and the Conference USA Player of the Week award two times.  During the postseason, he was a part of Houston's team during the 2009 College Basketball Invitational. His season was marred by an incident in January, 2009 in a game against Arizona in which he intentionally stepped on opposing player Chase Budinger's face. Coleman was suspended one game.

For the 2009–10 season, Aubrey Coleman ended the season as the nation's leading scorer in the NCAA.  A part of the first Cougars team to win the Conference USA men's basketball tournament in 2010, Coleman was also a part of the first Houston team to enter the NCAA Men's Division I Basketball Championship since 1992.

Professional
Coleman played for the New Orleans Hornets in the NBA Summer League in 2010, where he averaged 11.4 points and 3.0 rebounds in 5 games, and later joined the Turkish Basketball League team Aliağa Petkim, but left the team in December 2010 due to personal reasons. It was announced that Coleman had joined the Austin Toros of the NBA Development League on January 6, 2011. In April 2011 he signed with Angelico Biella in Italy until the end of the season.

After being reacquired by the Toros for the 2012–13 season, on February 22, 2013, he was traded to the Reno Bighorns in exchange for Dontell Jefferson. However, on February 25 and after just two games, he was waived by the Bighorns. In March 2013, he signed with Cholet Basket. On July 16, 2013, Coleman signed with Cimberio Varese. He parted ways with them on December 10, 2013, and signed with Nilan Bisons Loimaa of Korisliiga in Finland in February 2014.

On August 16, 2014, he signed with Best Balıkesir of the Turkish Basketball Second League.

On December 5, 2017, he signed with Russian club Spartak Primorye.

Career statistics

College

|-
| style="text-align:left;"| 2008–09
| style="text-align:left;"| Houston
| 32 || 32 || 32.8 || .426 || .208 || .763 || 8.2 || 2.4 || 2.3 || .0 || 19.4
|-
| style="text-align:left;"| 2009–10
| style="text-align:left;"| Houston
| 35 || 35 || 36.9 || .425 || .317 || .737 || 7.4 || 2.6 || 2.7 || .2 || style="background:#cfecec;" | 25.6*
|- class="sortbottom"
| style="text-align:center;" colspan="2"| Career
| 67 || 67 || 35.0 || .426 || .292 || .748 || 7.8 || 2.5 || 2.5 || .1 || 22.6

References

External links
NBA D-League Profile
Profile at Eurobasket.com
RealGM Profile

1987 births
Living people
Aliağa Petkim basketball players
American expatriate basketball people in Argentina
American expatriate basketball people in China
American expatriate basketball people in the Czech Republic
American expatriate basketball people in Finland
American expatriate basketball people in France
American expatriate basketball people in Italy
American expatriate basketball people in Russia
American expatriate basketball people in Turkey
American men's basketball players
Austin Toros players
Basketball players from Houston
BC Spartak Primorye players
Best Balıkesir B.K. players
Cholet Basket players
Basketball Nymburk players
Estudiantes Concordia basketball players
Houston Cougars men's basketball players
Nilan Bisons players
Junior college men's basketball players in the United States
Pallacanestro Biella players
Pallacanestro Varese players
Reno Bighorns players
Shooting guards
Yalovaspor BK players